Ronald Roy Roberts (born 1944) is a former Australian politician. He was a member of the South Australian Legislative Council representing the Labor Party from 1989 to 2006. He served as President of the Council from 2002 to 2006.

References

 

1944 births
Living people
Members of the South Australian Legislative Council
Presidents of the South Australian Legislative Council
Place of birth missing (living people)
Australian Labor Party members of the Parliament of South Australia
21st-century Australian politicians